Timothy Patrick Murphy (November 3, 1959 – December 6, 1988) was an American actor, perhaps best known for his role as Mickey Trotter on the popular CBS prime time soap opera Dallas from 1982–83.

Career
Murphy started his acting career as an adolescent in several television commercials and from there he went on to act in the 1978 miniseries Centennial. Other than his role in Dallas, he spent more than a year playing a young conman on the CBS daytime soap drama Search for Tomorrow, and also had a regular role on the short-lived 1984 ABC prime-time drama Glitter. In addition to this, he appeared in episodes of the television shows Quincy, M.E., CHiPs, Teachers Only, Hotel, The Love Boat and Hunter.

He appeared in the 1981 film The Bushido Blade. One of Murphy's most substantial roles was in the 1984 feature film Sam's Son, the film biography of the early life of actor Michael Landon, in which he played the character of Gene Orowitz (the young Landon).

In 1984 he won the Young Artist Award for Best Young Actor (Guest) in a TV Series for his work on The Love Boat.

Personal life and death
Murphy was gay and had a romantic relationship with actor Mark Patton during the 1980s.

Murphy died of AIDS on December 6, 1988 in Sherman Oaks, California, aged 29, and was buried at the Forest Lawn, Hollywood Hills Cemetery in Los Angeles.

His younger brother, actor Patrick Sean Murphy (born January 29, 1965), was killed in the North Tower of World Trade Center during the attacks of September 11, 2001. He was 36 years old.

Filmography

References

External links

AIDS-related deaths in California
American male child actors
American male film actors
American male television actors
Burials at Forest Lawn Memorial Park (Hollywood Hills)
Male actors from Hartford, Connecticut
1959 births
1988 deaths
20th-century American male actors
American gay actors
LGBT people from California
20th-century American LGBT people